Kawahíva (Kawahíb, Kagwahib) is a Tupi–Guarani dialect cluster of Brazil. The major variety is Tenharim.

The Tenharim (self-designation, Pyri 'near, together'), Parintintín, Jiahúi, Amondawa, Karipúna (not to be confused with neither the Panoan group, nor the Carib-based creole spoken in the state of Amapá, which all have the same name), Uru-eu-wau-wau (self-designation, Jupaú), Júma, Piripkúra, and Capivarí all call themselves Kawahíva. Their speech is mutually intelligible, and also similar with other languages now extinct. The closest Tupí-Guaraní language seems to be Apiaká, spoken in Mato Grosso.

Varieties
There are different internal classifications of the pan-Kawahíwa, which differ in, e.g., whether Kayabí and Apiaká should be included as part of the dialectal cluster. The one listed in Aguilar (2013, 2018) follows:

Northern Kawahíwa

Southern Kawahíwa
Jupaú

Apiaká
Kayabí (Kawaiwete)

isolated groups

Languages spoken in north-central Rondônia are Karipúna, Uru-eu-wau-wau (Jupaú), Amondawa, and unidentified varieties by some isolated groups. Languages spoken in northeastern Mato Grosso and southern Pará are Apiaká, Kayabí, Piripkúra, and unidentified varieties by some isolated groups.

Phonology

Tenharim dialect
Phonemic inventory of the Tenharim dialect:

Júma dialect
Phonemic inventory of the Júma dialect:

References

External links 
 
 

Tupi–Guarani languages
Languages of Brazil
Mamoré–Guaporé linguistic area